Gol Bygdetun is an outdoor museum in the village of Gol in Viken county, Norway. Gol Bygdetun is a subsidiary of Hallingdal Museum.

Gol is located in the traditional rural region of Hallingdal. Gol Bygdetun was built around the former Skaga farm. The museum contains farm buildings of various types. The museum features a stabbur, barn, sauna, summer farm, mill, and smokehouse.  The museum also includes Dokken Fjellgard, a former mountain farm in the nearby village of Sudndalen in Hol.

References

External links
 Gol Bygdetun Official website (in Norwegian)

Hallingdal
Museums in Viken
Local museums in Norway
Gol, Norway